The Hamilton County Memorial Building, more commonly called Memorial Hall, is located at Elm & Grant Streets, in Cincinnati, Ohio. The building is next to Cincinnati's Music Hall and across from Washington Park in the Over-the-Rhine neighborhood. It was built by the Grand Army of the Republic and Hamilton County in 1908, as a memorial to the military of the city and county. The building was built in the Beaux-Arts style. The building, including the Annie W and Elizabeth M Anderson Theater, is used for 300+ events per year.

Constructed according to a design by Samuel Hannaford and Sons, the Memorial Building was intended to commemorate members of all branches of the U.S. armed services, as well as the pioneers who had established the United States. The hall contains a 556-seat theater that was designed for speaking, but is also used as a venue for concerts, film screenings and theatrical events. The theater's small size produces a sense of intimacy among the audience, and its acoustics are exceptional: words spoken on stage in a normal voice can easily be understood even at the back of the balcony.

In late 1978, the Memorial Building was listed on the National Register of Historic Places, qualifying for inclusion both because of its architecture and because of its place in the area's history. Its location on Washington Park places it in the historic district that embraces most of Over-the-Rhine, which was added to the Register five years after the Memorial Building was individually added.

An $11 million renovation to the building was completed in December 2016 and allowed for the preservation of its historic character. Additionally, extensive improvements have been made to increase audience and performer comfort, modernize amenities, and enhance performances. The renovations include new, larger restroom facilities, a new HVAC system to accommodate year-round events, new and more comfortable seating, the addition of a contemporary catering kitchen and backstage crossover space for performers. Lastly, the acquisition of new equipment, audio/visual components, and technology to ensure the best possible event experience.

References

External links
Memorial Hall OTR
Concert Listings

Buildings and structures completed in 1908
National Register of Historic Places in Cincinnati
Samuel Hannaford buildings
Buildings and structures in Cincinnati
1908 establishments in Ohio
Individually listed contributing properties to historic districts on the National Register in Ohio
Over-the-Rhine